Abbey Rangers Football Club is a football club based in Addlestone, England.

History
The club were established in 1976, initially as a youth club for boys aged 7–16, and were named after the nearby Chertsey Abbey. Having played in both Chertsey and Addlestone, they became members of the Surrey & Hants Border League, winning Division One in 2004–05. After finishing as runners-up the following season, they left the league, joining Division One of the Guildford & Woking Alliance. They were Division One champions at the first attempt, earning promotion to the Premier Division. The club were Premier Division runners-up the following season, and were promoted to Division One of the Surrey County Intermediate League (Western). They went on to win the division and the League Cup in their first season in the league, resulting in promotion to the Premier Division.

After finishing second in the Premier Division in 2010–11, the club joined the Surrey Elite Intermediate League. They remained in the league until 2014–15 when a fourth-placed finish resulted in promotion to Division One of the Combined Counties League. In their first season in Division One, they finished third, earning promotion to the Premier Division.

The 2016–17 season saw the club enter the FA Cup for the first time in their history when they entered the competition in the preliminary qualification round.

Ground

The club play at Addlestone Moor.

Honours
Surrey County Intermediate League (Western)
Division One champions 2008–09
League Cup winners 2008–09
Guildford & Woking Alliance
Division One champions 2006–07
Surrey & Hants Border League
Division One champions 2004–05

Records
Best FA Cup performance: Third qualifying round, 2019–20
Best FA Vase performance: Fifth round, 2018–19

References

External links

Football clubs in England
Football clubs in Surrey
1976 establishments in England
Association football clubs established in 1976
Surrey & Hants Border Football League
Guildford and Woking Alliance League
Surrey County Intermediate League (Western)
Surrey Elite Intermediate Football League
Combined Counties Football League